Whitney Jones  (born August 11, 1986) is a retired American tennis player.

On August 1, 2011, she reached her highest WTA singles ranking of 572 whilst her best doubles ranking was 230 on October 10, 2011.

She played at the 2007 Sunfeast Open in the doubles draw and partnered Sandy Gumulya. Jones and Gumulya defeated Anne Keothavong and Hana Šromová in the first round before losing to İpek Şenoğlu and Yaroslava Shvedova in the quarterfinals.

Whitney Jones now resides in Washington D.C. and is a medical student at Howard University College of Medicine. She is now a resident in general surgery at Northwestern University.

ITF Circuit finals

Doubles: 9 (1–8)

External links
 
 

American female tennis players
1986 births
Living people
21st-century American women